Isidro Fabré Fontrodona (May 15, 1895 - death date unknown) was a Cuban baseball pitcher in the Negro leagues. He played from 1918 to 1939, mostly with the Cuban Stars (East). Fabré was elected to the Cuban Baseball Hall of Fame in 1956.

References

External links
 and Baseball-Reference Black Baseball stats and Seamheads

1895 births
Baseball players from Havana
Cuban Stars (West) players
Cuban Stars (East) players
Almendares (baseball) players
Year of death unknown